This list of most-retweeted tweets contains the top 30 tweets with the most retweets (an account's tweet that is sent again by additional accounts without any change) of all time on the social networking platform Twitter; Twitter does not provide an official list but news and mainstream media make lists. Three accounts have more than one of the most-retweeted tweets in the top 30: South Korean band BTS has nineteen, while Maezawa and YouTubers El Rubius and Hikakin each have two.

List 
The following table lists the top 30 most-retweeted tweets on Twitter, the account that tweeted it, the total number of retweets rounded down to the nearest hundred thousand, and the date it was originally tweeted. Tweets that have an identical number of retweets are listed in date order with the most recent tweet ranked highest. The notes include the details surrounding the tweet.

See also

 List of most-followed Twitter accounts
 List of most-liked tweets
 List of most-subscribed YouTube channels
 List of most-disliked YouTube videos
 List of most-liked YouTube videos
 List of most-liked Instagram posts

Notes

References

Tweets, most-retweeted
Tweets, most-retweeted
Twitter retweets